The Schröder Professorship of German is the senior professorship in the study of the German language at the University of Cambridge, and was founded in 1909 by a donation of £20,000 from Sir John Henry Freiherr von Schröder, Bt. of J. H. Schröder & Co, a City of London banking firm.

Schröder Professors
 Karl Hermann Breul (1910)
 Robert Allan Williams (1932)
 Eliza Marian Butler (1944)
 Walter Horace Bruford (1951)
 Leonard Wilson Forster (1961)
 Dennis Howard Green (1979)
 Roger Cole Paulin (1989)
 Nicholas Boyle (2006)
 Sarah Colvin (2014)

References

http://www.vifabbi.de/fabian?Libraries_In_The_Britisch_Isles
Newspaper report: "Too much German"

Language education in the United Kingdom
German, Schröder
School of Arts and Humanities, University of Cambridge
German, Schröder
German-language education
1909 establishments in England